The Colorado Springs Snow Sox were a professional baseball team based in Colorado Springs, Colorado. The team was a member of the Pecos League, an independent baseball league which is not affiliated with Major or Minor League Baseball.

History 

On January 12, 2021, it was announced that Snow Sox would join the Pecos League for the 2021 season.

Before the 2023 Season, The Snow Snox were removed from the Pecos League for unknown reasons.

Roster

References

External links
Colorado Springs Snow Sox official website

Pecos League teams
Professional baseball teams in Colorado
Sports in Colorado Springs, Colorado
Baseball teams established in 2021
2021 establishments in Colorado